Haribati is a small village in Bhatar CD block in Bardhaman Sadar North subdivision of Purba Bardhaman district in the state of West Bengal, India with total 171 families residing.

Transport 

Population 
In Haribati village, most of the villagers are from Schedule Caste (SC). Schedule Caste (SC) constitutes 36.83% while Schedule Tribe (ST) were 10.84% of total population in Haribati village.

Population and house data

References 

Villages in Purba Bardhaman district